Höchheim is a municipality in the district of Rhön-Grabfeld in Bavaria in Germany.  Höchheim consists of the following villages: Gollmuthhausen, Höchheim, Irmelshausen, Rothausen.

References

Rhön-Grabfeld
Bibra family